The Alabama Independent School Association is an organization of private schools in Alabama, formed in 1966 as the Alabama Private School Association. Originally a group of eight segregation academies, the membership grew to 60 by the 1971–72 school year. In 1990, the group voted to change its name to the Alabama Independent School Association. In 2008, an all-black school, Restoration Academy joined the AISA with no serious incidents. Today, the AISA serves 70 member schools.  Most member schools are located in the state of Alabama, but one member school is located in Meridian, MS and one affiliate member is located in Smyrna, TN 

The association offers its members with the opportunity to participate in numerous academic competitions, professional development programs, athletic programs and legislative tracking services as well.

In addition to the opportunities to participate in academic competitions, professional development and athletics, the AISA also maintains an accreditation partnership with AdvancED and offers member schools the opportunity for dual accreditation through AISA & AdvancED. This partnership was formed in 2012 after the long history of accreditation being offered through the AISA.

The athletic department of the Alabama Independent School Association sanctions and oversees high school athletics for approximately 50 private schools in the American state of Alabama. 
Sanctioned varsity and junior varsity sports include the following: football, basketball, baseball, fast-pitch softball, track and field, volleyball, golf, tennis, soccer, and cheerleading. Schools are classified into three classes, according to student enrollment, with championships awarded by class. The AISA also sanctions youth football for second grade through sixth grade.

The AISA offices are located on the campus of Huntingdon College in Montgomery, Alabama.

Conferences

District 1

 Meadowview Christian School, Selma
 Patrician Academy, Butler
 Pickens Academy, Carrollton
 Russell Christian Academy, Meridian, MS
 South Choctaw Academy, Toxey
 Southern Academy, Greensboro

District 2

 Bayside Academy, Daphne
 Bright Dyslexia Academy, Mobile
 Central Christian School, Robertsdale
 Cottage Hill Christian Academy, Mobile
 Faith Academy, Mobile
 Government Street Christian School, Mobile
 Lighthouse Baptist Academy, Theodore
 North Mobile Christian School, Saraland (K-8)
 Prichard Preparatory School, Mobile (K-5)
 St. Paul's Episcopal School, Mobile
 St. Michael Catholic High School, Fairhope
 Snook Christian Academy, Foley
 Temple Christian Academy, Atmore
 UMS-Wright Preparatory School, Mobile

District 3

 Clarke Prep School, Grove Hill
 Escambia Academy, Atmore
 Fort Dale Academy, Greenville
 Jackson Academy, Jackson
 Lowndes Academy, Lowndesboro
 Monroe Academy, Monroeville
 Morgan Academy, Selma
 Sparta Academy, Evergreen
 Wilcox Academy, Camden

District 4

 Abbeville Christian Academy, Abbeville
 Crenshaw Christian Academy, Luverne
 Houston Academy, Dothan
 Northside Methodist Academy, Dothan
 Pike Liberal Arts School, Troy
 The Lakeside School, Eufaula

District 5

 Autauga Academy, Prattville
 Eastwood Christian School, Montgomery
 Evangel Christian Academy, Montgomery
 Hooper Academy, Hope Hull
 Saint James School, Montgomery
 Success Unlimited Academy, Montgomery
 The Montgomery Academy, Montgomery
 Trinity Presbyterian School, Montgomery
 Valiant Cross Academy, Montgomery

District 6

 Chambers Academy, Lafayette
 Churchill Academy, Montgomery
 Coosa Valley Academy, Harpersville
 Edgewood Academy, Elmore
 Glenwood School, Smiths Station
 Lee-Scott Academy, Auburn
 Macon East Academy, Montgomery
 Southern Preparatory Academy, Camp Hill
 Springwood School, Lanett
 The Oaks School, Opelika

District 7

 Advent Episcopal School, Birmingham (K-8)
 Altamont School, Birmingham
 Banks School, Banks
 Bessemer Academy, Bessemer
 Cahawba Christian School, Centreville
 The Capitol School, Tuscaloosa
 Coosa Christian School, Gadsden
 Cornerstone Christian School, Birmingham
 The Donoho School, Anniston
 Gathering Place Christian Academy, Moody (K-8)
 Heritage Christian Academy, Decatur
 Highlands School, Birmingham (K-8)
 Hillsboro School, Helena
 Indian Springs School
 Miracle Academy, Birmingham (K-8)
 New Hope Christian School, Birmingham (K-8)
 North River Christian Academy, Tuscaloosa
 Randolph School, Huntsville
 Restoration Academy, Fairfield
 Riverhill School, Florence (PK-6)
 Rock City Preparatory Christian School, Birmingham
 Spring Valley School, Birmingham
 Sumiton Christian School, Sumiton
 Tuscaloosa Academy, Tuscaloosa
 Tuscaloosa Christian School, Cottondale
 Victory Christian School, Millbrook

References

External links
AISA official web site

High school sports in Alabama
High school sports associations in the United States
Segregation academies in Alabama
Private and independent school organizations in the United States
1966 establishments in Alabama
Educational institutions established in 1966
Organizations based in Alabama